Inside is the debut album by alternative rock musician Matthew Sweet.  It was released on Columbia Records in 1986. Sweet was dropped from the label after the album's release, and would not put out another record for three years.

Production
The album was recorded in multiple studios with a large number of producers and musicians, including Bernie Worrell, Chris Stamey, Scott Litt, Don Dixon, and Aimee Mann, among others.

Critical reception
Trouser Press called the album "a bit like R.E.M. and early dB’s doing sincere power-pop with keyboards." The Rolling Stone Album Guide wrote that the songs "come across like the snappy work of a brainy Tommy James." The Spin Alternative Record Guide called Inside "notable only because it features ten different producers, none of whom have a clue what to do with Sweet's music." The Chicago Reader called it "tuneful and pleasant but ... sunk by the electropop, machine-driven production Sweet was pursuing."

Track listing
All songs written by Matthew Sweet; except where indicated
 "Quiet Her"
 "Blue Fools"
 "We Lose Another Day" (Sweet, Pal Shazar)
 "Catch Your Breath"
 "Half Asleep"
 "This Above All"
 "Save Time for Me" (Sweet, Jules Shear)
 "By Herself" (Sweet, Adele Bertei)
 "Brotherhood" (Sweet, Pal Shazar)
 "Love I Trusted"
 "Watch You Walking" (Sweet, Pal Shazar)

References

1986 debut albums
Matthew Sweet albums
Albums produced by David Kahne
Albums produced by Stephen Hague
Albums produced by Don Dixon (musician)
Albums produced by Matthew Sweet
Albums produced by Alan Tarney